Marondry  is a village in Analamanga Region, in the  Central Highlands of Madagascar, located north-west from the capital of Antananarivo. The population was 10,110 in 2018.

The municipality was created in 2003. Before it belonged to the municipality of Antotohazo.

References

Populated places in Analamanga